Iván Bravo Castro (born 20 January 2001) is a Spanish footballer who plays for CA Osasuna B as a left back.

Club career
Bravo was born in Salt, Girona, Catalonia, and joined FC Barcelona's La Masia in 2010, after representing Girona FC and UE La Salle Girona. In 2019, he moved to RCD Mallorca and was assigned to their Juvenil A squad.

Bravo started to train with the main squad in May 2020, after the COVID-19 pandemic, and took part of the club's 2020 pre-season. On 13 September, before even appearing with the reserves, he made his professional debut by starting in a 0–1 home loss against Rayo Vallecano.

On 16 July 2021, Bravo signed a two-year contract with another reserve team, CA Osasuna in Segunda División B.

References

External links

2001 births
Living people
People from Gironès
Sportspeople from the Province of Girona
Spanish footballers
Footballers from Catalonia
Association football defenders
Segunda División players
Tercera División players
RCD Mallorca B players
RCD Mallorca players
CA Osasuna B players